Brusewitz is a German surname. Notable people with the surname include:
 Joachim Wilhelm Friedrich Carl Oscar von Brüsewitz (1891-1966), German podium dancer.
 Axel Brusewitz (1881–1950), Swedish professor of political science
 Helmut Brüsewitz (born 1925-1999), German bassist, composer and arranger best known through his works for Bert Kaempfert's special sound
 Oskar Brüsewitz (1929–1976), East German Lutheran pastor 
 Ellen Maria Brusewitz (née Holmström, 1878–1952), Swedish tennis player.
 Alice Brusewitz (née Palmer), New Zealand commercial photographer.
 Karl-Friedrich von Brüsewitz, (1738-1811), Prussian army officer

See also
Brüsewitz, a municipality in the Northwestern Mecklenburg district

German-language surnames